Gen-Probe was a company based in San Diego, in California, specializing in clinical diagnostics, blood screening, transplantation products and research products. 

The company's molecular diagnostics products were used for diagnosis of infectious diseases, blood screening, analyzing blood transfusions for immune response, testing coagulation pathways, and organ transplantation viability.  Their products and services also included technology and know-how in biomedical research and drug development.

The merger 

On 1 August 2012, Gen-Probe merged with Hologic.

References

External links 
 Official website

Companies formerly listed on the Nasdaq